Kristian Ostergaard (February 5, 1855 - October 9, 1931) was a Danish-American Lutheran pastor, educator, author and hymnwriter.

Background
Kristian Ostergaard was born at Østergård in the Hjerm parish of Viborg County, now Struer Municipality, Region Midtjylland, Denmark. He was the son of Peder Ø. Davidsen (1817 – 1876) and Maren Pedersdatter (1825 - c.1876).

Career
Ostergaard  immigrated to the United States during 1878.  He taught at the Danish Folk High School  (Højskolein) in Elk Horn, Iowa from its beginning in 1878. He also helped establish the Ashland Folk School at Grant, Michigan in 1882.
 
In 1885, he returned to Denmark, where he founded a Folk high school in Støvring (now Rebild municipality in  Region Nordjylland). In 1892, Ostergaard returned to the United States. He was ordained a Lutheran pastor in 1893. He served the ministry of the United Evangelical Lutheran Church. He ministered to a number of congregations before retiring in 1916 at Tyler, Minnesota.

Ostergaard devoted the remainder of his life to writing songs, poetry and fiction. His writings were all in the Danish language. He wrote a number of novels depicting the life among Danish-American immigrants. His novels provided accounts of the immigrants struggling to create communities on the prairies. Four of Ostegaard's novels are set in Nebraska. Several trace members of a family from their arrival in the early 1870s to their participation in the settling in their new home. Ostergaard's novels also reflected a debate in Danish society involving the influences of N. F. S. Grundtvig and George Brandes.  Ostergarrd additionally alluded to the Danish intellectual Soren Kierkegaard.

Ostergaard also wrote many songs and hymns. He published two songbooks: Børnesangbogen  (1898) and Den dansk-amerikanske Højskolesangbog  (1901). An anthology was published in 1912 as Songs of the Prairie. Most notably, Ostergaard wrote the hymn Den Sag er aldrig i Verden tabt. Translated  into English by Jens Christian Aaberg (1877-1970) as That Cause Can Never Be Lost Nor Stayed, it was published in Hymns and Hymnwriters of Denmark during  1945.

Ostergaard died in Tyler, Minnesota and was buried at the Danebod Lutheran Cemetery.

Selected works
Fra Skov og Prærie  (1883)
Vesterlide  (1889)
Nybyggere  (1891)
Blokhuset (1892)
Anton Arden  (1897)  
Et Købmandshus  (1909) 
Dalboerne  (1913) 
Danby Folk (1927)

References

Related Reading
Mortensen, E. (1977) Schools for life: The Grundtvigianfolk schools in America  (Askov, MN: American Publishing Co) 
Larson, D. C. (1980) The movement to preserve Danish culture in North America  (Pittsburgh. PA: University Center for International Studies, University of Pittsburgh)

1855 births
1931 deaths
People from Struer Municipality
Danish emigrants to the United States
20th-century American Lutheran clergy
Danish Lutherans
American male writers
American Lutheran hymnwriters
Danish Lutheran hymnwriters
Writers from Minnesota
Writers from Nebraska
People from Newaygo County, Michigan
People from Tyler, Minnesota
Songwriters from Michigan
Songwriters from Minnesota
19th-century American Lutheran clergy